The Highly Effective Detective is a  mystery novel by Rick Yancey.  It was released in 2006 by St. Martin's Press, receiving a starred review in Publishers Weekly and a positive review from School Library Journal.

The book, which is intended to become a series, tells the story of  former security guard Teddy Ruzak who begins a detective agency with his inheritance following the death of his mother.

2006 American novels
American young adult novels